Alpiarça is a municipality in Santarém District in Portugal. The population in 2011 was 7,702, in an area of 95.36 km2.

The present Mayor is Mário Fernando Pereira and the President of the Municipal Assembly is Mario Santiago. The municipal holiday is April 2.

Geography

Physical geography
Alpiarça is situated on a plateau in the landscape of the Vale do Tejo-Lezíria. The morphology of the terrain is marked by plain profile, sparsely covered by vegetation, and intensely proportioned by its proximity to Tagus, alternating with pasturelands.

Human geography

The municipality of Alpiarça includes only one civil parish, and is limited in the northeast and east by the municipality of Chamusca, southeast and southwest by the municipality of Almeirim and northwest by the municipality of Santarém.

International relations

Alpiarça municipality is twinned with:
 Wysokie Mazowieckie, Poland
 Champigny-sur-Marne, France

Architecture

 Archaeological site of Quinta da Goucha
 Archaeological site of Quinta dos Patudos
 Estate of Quinta dos Patudos
 Finances Building of Alpiarça
 Manorhouse of Quinta de São José
 Residence-Museum of Patudos/Residence of José Relvas
 Theatre of Alpiarça

Religious
 Church of Santo Estáquio

Notable people 
 José Relvas (1858 – 1929 in Alpiarça) a Portuguese politician and 70th Prime Minister of Portugal.
 Abel Fontoura da Costa (1869–1940) a Portuguese colonial administrator, a military officer, a politician and a scientist; governor of Cape Verde, 1915-1918
 Carlos Montez Melancia (1927 in Alpiarça – 2022) the Governor of Macau, 1987 to 1991

References

External links
Town Hall official website
Photos from Alpiarça

Populated places in Santarém District
Municipalities of Santarém District
People from Alpiarça